Bactericidal/permeability-increasing protein (BPI) is a 456-residue (~50kDa) protein that is part of the innate immune system. It belongs to family of lipid-binding serum glycoproteins.

Distribution and function
BPI was initially identified in neutrophils, but is found in other tissues including the epithelial lining of mucous membranes.
It is an endogenous antibiotic protein with potent killing activity against Gram-negative bacteria.  It binds to compounds called lipopolysaccharides produced by Gram-negative bacteria.  Lipolysaccharides are potent activators of the immune system; however, BPI at certain concentrations can prevent this activation.

BPI was discovered by Jerrold Weiss and Peter Elsbach at New York University Medical School.

rBPI21
Because lipopolysaccharides are potent inflammatory agents, and the action of antibiotics can result in the release of these compounds, the binding capacity of BPI was explored as a possible means of reducing injury.  Xoma Ltd. developed a recombinant 21kDa portion of the BPI molecule called rBPI21, NEUPREX, or opebecan.  In a trial, it was found to decrease the mortality of Gram-negative bacterial-induced sepsis.  Studies suggest that its binding activity is not the means by which it mediates its protective effect.  Studies show biological effects with Gram-positive bacteria and even in infection by the protozoan, Toxoplasma gondii.

The N-terminal portion of murine BPI (199 amino acids) genetically fused to Halobacterium sp. NRC-1 GvpC protein was bound to the surface of gas vesicle nanoparticles (GVNPs) and tested for protective activity using a murine model of endotoxic shock. Depending on the time of delivery and exposure to lethal concentrations of lipopolysaccharide (LPS) and D-galactosamine, the treatment resulted in increased survival and reduced symptoms of inflammation, including inflammatory anemia, recruitment of neutrophils, liver apoptosis as well as increased pro-inflammatory serum cytokine levels. When administered via footpad and before LPS exposure, there was 100% survival of the experimental cohort.

References

External links